The 2008 FIBA Europe Under-20 Championship Division B was the fourth edition of the Division B of the FIBA Europe Under-20 Championship, the second-tier level of European Under-20 basketball. The city of Târgu Mureș, in Romania, hosted the tournament. Germany won their first title.

Germany and Belgium were promoted to Division A.

Teams

Squads

Preliminary round
The nineteen teams were allocated in four groups (three groups of five teams and one groups of four). The two top teams of each group advanced to the Qualifying Round. The third and fourth of each group to the Classification round. The last three teams in the five-team groups advanced to another group to determine the positions 17th to 19th.

Group A

Group B

Group C

Group D

Qualifying round
The eight top teams were allocated in two groups of four teams each. Teams coming from the same initial group didn't play again vs. each other, but "carried" the results of the matches played between them for the first round.

Group E

Group F

Classification round
The third and fourth team of each of the preliminary round groups were allocated in two groups of four teams each. Teams coming from the same initial group didn't play again vs. each other, but "carried" the results of the matches played between them for the first round.

Group G

Group H

Classification round for 17th to 19th place
The last three teams of the five-team groups of the preliminary round were allocated in one group.

Group I

Knockout stage

13th–16th playoffs

9th–12th playoffs

5th–8th playoffs

Championship

Final standings

Stats leaders

Points

Rebounds

Assists

References
FIBA.com
FIBA Europe Archive

FIBA U20 European Championship Division B
2008–09 in European basketball
2008–09 in Romanian basketball
International youth basketball competitions hosted by Romania